Jeffersonian democracy, named after its advocate Thomas Jefferson, was one of two dominant political outlooks and movements in the United States from the 1790s to the 1820s. The Jeffersonians were deeply committed to American republicanism, which meant opposition to what they considered to be artificial aristocracy, opposition to corruption, and insistence on virtue, with a priority for the "yeoman farmer", "planters", and the "plain folk". They were antagonistic to the aristocratic elitism of merchants, bankers, and manufacturers, distrusted factory workers, and were on the watch for supporters of the Westminster system.

The term was commonly used to refer to the Democratic-Republican Party – formally named the "Republican Party" – which Jefferson founded in opposition to the Federalist Party of Alexander Hamilton. At the beginning of the Jeffersonian era, only two states (Vermont and Kentucky) had established universal white male suffrage by abolishing property requirements. By the end of the period, more than half of the states had followed suit, including virtually all of the states in the Old Northwest. States then also moved on to allowing white male popular votes for presidential elections, canvassing voters in a more modern style. Jefferson's party was then in full control of the apparatus of governmentfrom the state legislature and city hall to the White House.

Jeffersonian democracy persisted as an element of the Democratic Party into the early 20th century as exemplified by the rise of Jacksonian democracy and the three presidential candidacies of William Jennings Bryan.

Positions 

Jefferson has been called "the most democratic of the founders". The Jeffersonians advocated a narrow interpretation of the Constitution's Article I provisions granting powers to the federal government. They strenuously opposed the Federalist Party, led by Treasury Secretary Alexander Hamilton. President George Washington generally supported Hamilton's program for a financially strong national government. The election of Jefferson in 1800, which he called "the revolution of 1800", brought in the Presidency of Thomas Jefferson and the permanent eclipse of the Federalists, apart from the Supreme Court.

"Jeffersonian democracy" is an umbrella term and some factions favored some positions more than others. While principled, with vehemently held core beliefs, the Jeffersonians had factions that disputed the true meaning of their creed. For example, during the War of 1812 it became apparent that independent state militia units were inadequate for conducting a serious war against a major country. The new Secretary of War John C. Calhoun, a Jeffersonian, proposed to build up the Army. With the support of most Republicans in Congress, he got his way. However, the "Old Republican" faction, claiming to be true to the Jeffersonian Principles of '98, fought him and reduced the size of the Army after Spain sold Florida to the U.S.

Historians characterize Jeffersonian democracy as including the following core ideals:
 The core political value of America is republicanismcitizens have a civic duty to aid the state and resist corruption, especially monarchism and aristocracy.
 Jeffersonian values are best expressed through an organized political party. The Jeffersonian party was officially the "Republican Party" (political scientists later called it the Democratic-Republican Party to differentiate it from the later Republican Party of Lincoln).
 It was the duty of citizens to vote and the Jeffersonians invented many modern campaign techniques designed to get out the vote. Turnout indeed soared across the country. The work of John J. Beckley, Jefferson's agent in Pennsylvania, set new standards in the 1790s. In the 1796 presidential election, he blanketed the state with agents who passed out 30,000 hand-written tickets, naming all 15 electors (printed tickets were not allowed). Historians consider Beckley to be one of the first American professional campaign managers and his techniques were quickly adopted in other states.
 The Federalist Party, especially its leader Alexander Hamilton, was the arch-foe because of its acceptance of aristocracy and British methods.
 The national government is a dangerous necessity to be instituted for the common benefit, protection and security of the people, nation or communityit should be watched closely and circumscribed in its powers. Most anti-Federalists from 1787 to 1788 joined the Jeffersonians.
 Separation of church and state is the best method to keep government free of religious disputes and religion free from corruption by government.
 The federal government must not violate the rights of individuals. The Bill of Rights is a central theme.
 The federal government must not violate the rights of the states. The Kentucky and Virginia Resolutions of 1798 (written secretly by Jefferson and James Madison) proclaim these principles.
 Freedom of speech and the press are the best methods to prevent tyranny over the people by their own government.  The Federalists' violation of this freedom through the Alien and Sedition Acts of 1798 became a major issue.
 The yeoman farmer best exemplifies civic virtue and independence from corrupting city influencesgovernment policy should be for his benefit. Financiers, bankers, and industrialists make cities the "cesspools of corruption" and should be avoided.

 The United States Constitution was written in order to ensure the freedom of the people. However, as Jefferson wrote to James Madison in 1789, "no society can make a perpetual constitution or even a perpetual law. The earth belongs always to the living generation".
 All men have the right to be informed and thus to have a say in the government.  The protection and expansion of human liberty was one of the chief goals of the Jeffersonians. They also reformed their respective state systems of education. They believed that their citizens had a right to an education no matter their circumstance or status in life.
 The judiciary should be subservient to the elected branches and the Supreme Court should not have the power to strike down laws passed by Congress. The Jeffersonians lost this battle to Chief Justice John Marshall, a Federalist, who dominated the Court from 1801 to his death in 1835.

Foreign policy 
The Jeffersonians also had a distinct foreign policy:
 Americans had a duty to spread what Jefferson called the "Empire of Liberty" to the world, but should avoid "entangling alliances".
 Britain was the greatest threat, especially its monarchy, aristocracy, corruption, and business methodsthe Jay Treaty of 1794 was much too favorable to Britain and thus threatened American values.
 Regarding the French Revolution, its devotion to principles of Republicanism, liberty, equality, and fraternity made France the ideal European nation. According to Michael Hardt, "Jefferson's support of the French Revolution often serves in his mind as a defense of republicanism against the monarchism of the Anglophiles". On the other hand, Napoleon was the antithesis of republicanism and could not be supported.
 Navigation rights on the Mississippi River were critical to American national interests. Control by Spain was tolerablecontrol by France was unacceptable. The Louisiana Purchase was an unexpected opportunity to guarantee those rights which the Jeffersonians immediately seized upon.
 A standing army is dangerous to liberty and should be avoidedmuch better was to use economic coercion such as the embargo. See Embargo Act of 1807.
 Most Jeffersonians argued an expensive high seas navy was unnecessary, since cheap locally based gunboats, floating batteries, mobile shore batteries, and coastal fortifications could defend the ports without the temptation to engage in distant wars. Jefferson himself, however, wanted a few frigates to protect American shipping against Barbary pirates in the Mediterranean.
 The locally controlled non-professional militia was adequate to defend the nation from invasion. After the militia proved inadequate in the War of 1812, President Madison expanded the national army for the duration.

Westward expansion 
Territorial expansion of the United States was a major goal of the Jeffersonians because it would produce new farm lands for yeomen farmers. The Jeffersonians wanted to integrate the Indians into American society, or remove further west those tribes that refused to integrate. However Sheehan (1974) argues that the Jeffersonians, with the best of goodwill toward the Indians, destroyed their distinctive cultures with its misguided benevolence.

The Jeffersonians took enormous pride in the bargain they reached with France in the Louisiana Purchase of 1803. It opened up vast new fertile farmlands from Louisiana to Montana. Jefferson saw the West as an economic safety valve which would allow people in the crowded East to own farms. However, established New England political interests feared the growth of the West and a majority in the Federalist Party opposed the purchase. Jeffersonians thought the new territory would help maintain their vision of the ideal republican society, based on agricultural commerce, governed lightly and promoting self-reliance and virtue.

The Jeffersonians' dream did not come to pass as the Louisiana Purchase was a turning point in the history of American imperialism. The farmers with whom Jefferson identified conquered the West, often through violence against Native Americans. Jefferson himself sympathized with Native Americans, but that did not stop him from enacting policies that would continue the trend towards the dispossession of their lands.

Economics 
Jeffersonian agrarians held that the economy of the United States should rely more on agriculture for strategic commodities than on industry. Jefferson specifically believed: "Those who labor in the earth are the chosen people of God, if He ever had a chosen people, whose breast He has made His peculiar deposit for substantial and genuine virtue". However, Jeffersonian ideals are not opposed to all manufacturing, rather he believed that all people have the right to work to provide for their own subsistence and that an economic system which undermines that right is unacceptable.

Jefferson's belief was that unlimited expansion of commerce and industry would lead to the growth of a class of wage laborers who relied on others for income and sustenance.  The workers would no longer be independent voters. Such a situation, Jefferson feared, would leave the American people vulnerable to political subjugation and economic manipulation. The solution Jefferson came up with was, as scholar Clay Jenkinson noted, "a graduated income tax that would serve as a disincentive to vast accumulations of wealth and would make funds available for some sort of benign redistribution downward" as well as tariffs on imported articles, which were mainly purchased by the wealthy. In 1811, Jefferson wrote a friend:
These revenues will be levied entirely on the rich . ... The Rich alone use imported article, and on these alone the whole taxes of the General Government are levied. The poor man ... pays not a farthing of tax to the General Government, but on his salt.

However, Jefferson was of the belief that a tax on income as well as consumption would constitute excessive taxation, writing in an 1816 letter:... if the system be established on the basis of Income, and his just proportion on that scale has been already drawn from every one, to step into the field of Consumption and tax special articles ... is doubly taxing the same article. For that portion of Income with which these articles are purchased, having already paid its tax as Income, to pay another tax on the thing it purchased, is paying twice for the same thing; it is an aggrievance on the citizens who use these articles in exoneration of those who do not, contrary to the most sacred of the duties of a government, to do equal and impartial justice to all its citizens.Similarly, Jefferson had protectionist views on international trade.  He believed that not only would economic dependence on Europe diminish the virtue of the republic, but that the United States had an abundance of natural resources that Americans should be able to cultivate and use to tend to their own needs. Furthermore, exporting goods by merchant ships created risks of capture by foreign pirates and armies, which would require an expensive navy for protection. Lastly, he and other Jeffersonians believed in the power of embargoes as a means to inflict punishment on hostile foreign nations.  Jefferson preferred these methods of coercion to war.

Limited government 

While the Federalists advocated for a strong central government, Jeffersonians argued for strong state and local governments and a weak federal government. Self-sufficiency, self-government and individual responsibility were in the Jeffersonian worldview among the most important ideals that formed the basis of the American Revolution. In Jefferson's opinion, nothing that could feasibly be accomplished by individuals at the local level ought to be accomplished by the federal government.  The federal government would concentrate its efforts solely on national and international projects. Jefferson's advocacy of limited government led to sharp disagreements with Federalist figures such as Alexander Hamilton. Jefferson felt that Hamilton favored plutocracy and the creation of a powerful aristocracy in the United States which would accumulate increasingly greater power until the political and social order of the United States became indistinguishable from those of the Old World.

After initial skepticism, Jefferson supported the ratification of the United States Constitution and especially supported its stress on checks and balances. The ratification of the United States Bill of Rights, especially the First Amendment, gave Jefferson even greater confidence in the document. Jeffersonians favored a strict construction interpretation of federal government powers described in Article I of the Constitution. For example, Jefferson once wrote a letter to Charles Willson Peale explaining that although a Smithsonian-style national museum would be a wonderful resource, he could not support the use of federal funds to construct and maintain such a project. The "strict constructionism" of today is a remote descendant of Jefferson's views.

Politics and factions 

The spirit of Jeffersonian democracy dominated American politics from 1800 to 1824, the First Party System, under Jefferson and succeeding presidents James Madison and James Monroe. The Jeffersonians proved much more successful than the Federalists in building state and local party organizations that united various factions. Voters in every state formed blocs loyal to the Jeffersonian coalition.

Prominent spokesmen for Jeffersonian principles included Madison, Albert Gallatin, John Randolph of Roanoke,  Nathaniel Macon, John Taylor of Caroline, and James Monroe, as well as John C. Calhoun, John Quincy Adams, and Henry Clay (with the last three taking new paths after 1828).

Randolph was the Jeffersonian leader in Congress from 1801 to 1815, but he later broke with Jefferson and formed his own "Tertium Quids" faction because he thought the president no longer adhered to the true Jeffersonian principles of 1798. The Quids wanted to actively punish and discharge Federalists in the government and in the courts. Jefferson himself sided with the moderate faction exemplified by figures such as Madison, who were much more conciliatory towards Federalism.

After the Madison administration experienced serious trouble financing the War of 1812 and discovered the Army and militia were unable to make war effectively, a new generation of Republican nationalists emerged. They were supported by President James Monroe, an original Jeffersonian; and included John Quincy Adams, Henry Clay and John C. Calhoun. In 1824, Adams defeated Andrew Jackson, who had support from the Quids; and in a few years two successor parties had emerged, the Democratic Party, which  formulated Jacksonian democracy and which still exists; and Henry Clay's Whig Party. Their competition marked the Second Party System.

After 1830, the principles were still talked about but did not form the basis of a political party, thus editor Horace Greeley in 1838 started a magazine, The Jeffersonian, that he said "would exhibit a practical regard for that cardinal principle of Jeffersonian Democracy, and the People are the sole and safe depository of all power, principles and opinions which are to direct the Government".

Jefferson and Jeffersonian principles 

Jeffersonian democracy was not a one-man operation. It was a large political party with many local and state leaders and various factions, and they did not always agree with Jefferson or with each other.

Jefferson was accused of inconsistencies by his opponents. The "Old Republicans" said that he abandoned the Principles of 1798. He believed the national security concerns were so urgent that it was necessary to purchase Louisiana without waiting for a Constitutional amendment. He enlarged federal power through the intrusively-enforced Embargo Act of 1807. He idealized the "yeoman farmer" despite being himself a gentleman plantation owner.  The disparities between Jefferson's philosophy and practice have been noted by numerous historians. Staaloff proposed that it was due to his being a proto-Romantic; John Quincy Adams claimed that it was a manifestation of pure hypocrisy, or "pliability of principle"; and Bailyn asserts it simply represented a contradiction with Jefferson, that he was "simultaneously a radical utopian idealist and a hardheaded, adroit, at times cunning politician". However, Jenkinson argued that Jefferson's personal failings ought not to influence present day thinkers to disregard Jeffersonian ideals.

Kuehnelt-Leddihn, a European nobleman who opposed democracy, argues that "Jeffersonian democracy" is a misnomer because Jefferson was not a democrat, but in fact believed in rule by an elite: "Jefferson actually was an Agrarian Romantic who dreamt of a republic governed by an elite of character and intellect".

Historian Sean Wilentz argues that as a practical politician elected to serve the people Jefferson had to negotiate solutions, not insist on his own version of abstract positions. The result, Wilentz argues, was "flexible responses to unforeseen events ... in pursuit of ideals ranging from the enlargement of opportunities for the mass of ordinary, industrious Americans to the principled avoidance of war".

Historians have long portrayed the contest between Jefferson and Hamilton as iconic for the politics, political philosophy, economic policies and future direction of the United States. In 2010, Wilentz identified a scholarly trend in Hamilton's favor: "In recent years, Hamilton and his reputation have decidedly gained the initiative among scholars who portray him as the visionary architect of the modern liberal capitalist economy and of a dynamic federal government headed by an energetic executive. Jefferson and his allies, by contrast, have come across as naïve, dreamy idealists. At best according to many historians, the Jeffersonians were reactionary utopians who resisted the onrush of capitalist modernity in hopes of turning America into a yeoman farmers' arcadia. At worst, they were proslavery racists who wish to rid the West of Indians, expand the empire of slavery, and keep political power in local hands – all the better to expand the institution of slavery and protect slaveholders' rights to own human property. Joseph Ellis wrote that developments in urbanization and industrialization that occurred during the turn of the 20th century has largely rendered Jefferson's agrarian dream irrelevant.

Jefferson summarized his essential principles of government in his first inaugural address March 4, 1801, when he expounded on "the essential principles of our Government, and consequently those which ought to shape its Administration", stating:
Equal and exact justice to all men, of whatever state or persuasion, religious or political; peace, commerce, and honest friendship with all nations, entangling alliances with none; the support of the State governments in all their rights, as the most competent administrations for our domestic concerns and the surest bulwarks against anti-republican tendencies; the preservation of the General Government in its whole constitutional vigor, as the sheet anchor of our peace at home and safety abroad; a jealous care of the right of election by the people...; absolute acquiescence in the decisions of the majority...a well-disciplined militia, our best reliance in peace and for the first moments of war till regulars may relieve them; the supremacy of the civil over the military authority; economy in the public expense, that labor may be lightly burthened; the honest payment of our debts and sacred preservation of the public faith; encouragement of agriculture, and of commerce as its handmaid; the diffusion of information and arraignment of all abuses at the bar of the public reason; freedom of religion; freedom of the press, and freedom of person under the protection of the habeas corpus, and trial by juries impartially selected.

See also

Notes

Further reading 
 Banning, Lance. The Jeffersonian Persuasion: Evolution of a Party Ideology (1978) online free to borrow
 Banning, Lance. "Jeffersonian Ideology Revisited: Liberal and Classical Ideas in the New American Republic," William and Mary Quarterly (1986) 43#1 pp. 3–19 in JSTOR
 Beard, Charles A. "Some Economic Origins of Jeffersonian Democracy." American Historical Review 19#2 (1914): pp. 282–298; Summary of his famous book; in JSTOR
 Brown; Stuart Gerry. The First Republicans: Political Philosophy and Public Policy in the Party of Jefferson and Madison (1954) online
 Cunningham, Noble E. The Jeffersonian Republicans in power; party operations, 1801–1809 (1963) online free to borrow
 Elkins, Stanley M. and Eric L. McKitrick. The Age of Federalism: The Early American Republic, 1788–1800 (1995), the standard political history of the 1790s  online free to borrow
 Hendrickson, David C. and Robert W. Tucker. Empire of Liberty: the statecraft of Thomas Jefferson (1990); His foreign policy
 Jefferson, Thomas.   "The Jeffersonian cyclopedia: a ...".  topical compendium of Jefferson's statements and quotes
 Jenkinson, Clay S.  Becoming Jefferson's People: Re-Inventing the American Republic in the Twenty-First Century.  Reno: Marmouth Press, 2004
 McCoy, Drew R. The elusive Republic : political economy in Jeffersonian America (1982) online free to borrow
 Onuf, Peter, ed. Jeffersonian legacies (1993) online free to borrow
 Parrington, Vernon.  Main Currents in American Thought (1927) v 2 online
 Pasley, Jeff.  The Tyranny of Printers. The Tyranny of Printers : Jeffrey L. Pasley 
 Peterson, Merrill D. The Jefferson Image in the American Mind (1960)
 Robinson, William A. Jeffersonian democracy in New England (Yale U.P. 1916) online
 Taylor, Jeff. Where Did the Party Go?: William Jennings Bryan, Hubert Humphrey, and the Jeffersonian Legacy (2006).
 White, Leonard. The Jeffersonians, 1801–1829: A Study in Administrative History (1951) comprehensive coverage of all cabinet and federal executive agencies and their main activities. online
 Wilentz, Sean. The Rise of American Democracy: Jefferson to Lincoln (2005), comprehensive political history, 1800–1865.
 Wilentz, Sean. "Jeffersonian democracy and the origins of political antislavery in the United States: The Missouri crisis revisited." Journal of the Historical Society 4#3 (2004): pp. 375–401.
 Wiltse, Charles Maurice. The Jeffersonian Tradition in American Democracy (1935) online free to borrow
 Wiltse, Charles M. "Jeffersonian Democracy: a Dual Tradition." American Political Science Review (1934) 28#05 pp. 838–851. in JSTOR
 Wood, Gordon S.  The American Revolution: A History.  New York: The Modern Library, 2002.
 ––––.  Empire of Liberty: A History of the Early Republic, 1789–1815.  Oxford University Press, 2009.
 Wright, Benjamin F. "The Philosopher of Jeffersonian Democracy." American Political Science Review 22#4 (1928): pp. 870–892. in JSTOR

Historiography 
 Cogliano, Francis D. ed. A Companion to Thomas Jefferson (2012), 648 pp; 34 essays by scholars focusing on how historians have handled Jefferson. online
 Robertson, Andrew W. "Afterword: Reconceptualizing Jeffersonian Democracy," Journal of the Early Republic (2013) 33#2 pp. 317–334 on recent  voting studies online

 
1790s in the United States
1800s in the United States
1810s in the United States
American political philosophy
Classical liberalism
Eponymous political ideologies
Left-wing populism in the United States
Liberalism in the United States
Western United States
Thomas Jefferson
Radicalism (historical)
Populism
Political history of the United States
Political positions of presidents of the United States
Political positions of state governors of the United States
Types of democracy
Factions in the Democratic Party (United States)